The 2011 Colchester Borough Council election took place on 5 May 2011 to elect members of Colchester Borough Council in Essex, England. One third of the council was up for election and the council stayed under no overall control.

After the election, the composition of the council was
Liberal Democrats 26
Conservative 24
Labour 7
Independent 3

Election result
No seats changed hands at the election with the Liberal Democrats remaining on 26 seats after holding 7 seats, ahead of the Conservatives, who stayed on 24 seats after retaining the 9 seats they had been defending. Meanwhile, Labour retained 3 seats to keep 7 councillors and 1 independent retained his seat. Among those to hold their seats were the Liberal Democrat group leader Martin Hunt in Christ Church ward and the Labour group leader Tim Young in St Andrews, while the closest result saw Conservative Pauline Hazell retain Shrub End by 123 votes from the Liberal Democrats

The coalition between the Liberal Democrats, Labour and the independents remained in charge, with Liberal Democrat Anne Turrell staying as leader of the council, after holding her seat in Mile End at the election.

Ward results

Berechurch

Birch & Winstree

Castle

Christ Church

Copford & West Stanway

Fordham & Stour

Great Tey

Highwoods

Mile End

New Town

Prettygate

St. Andrew's

St. Anne's

Shrub End

Stanway

Tiptree

West Bergholt & Eight Ash Green

West Mersea

Wivenhoe Cross

Wivenhoe Quay

References

2011 English local elections
2011
2010s in Essex